Water Tower, formerly known as The Water Tower Bucket Boys and Water Tower String Band, is an American bluegrass, old time, and punk band formed in Portland, Oregon in 2005. The band was originally formed in high school by Kenny Feinstein (guitar, lead vocals) and his neighbor, Josh Rabie (fiddle). They put out one album under the name Water Tower String Band and two albums as The Water Tower Bucket Boys, with various line ups, before changing their name to Water Tower in 2011. Rabie left the band in 2013 and Feinstein spent a year recording and putting out a solo album, an acoustic cover of My Bloody Valentine's Loveless called Loveless: Hurts to Love.

Guitarist Peter Daggatt, bassist Pat Norris, and drummer Harry Selick joined the band later in 2013 and the four-piece started recording Water Tower's first album. In 2014 the whole band relocated to Los Angeles, California and continued working on the album while busking on the streets to support themselves. Fly Around (2020) took seven years to complete and featured guest vocals from former Old Crow Medicine Show member Willie Watson, Bullets & Octane's Gene Louis, and the former singer of Black Flag, Ron Reyes. The album was co-produced by Don Bolles, the former drummer of the Germs/45 Grave, and solo artist Ariel Pink.

Joe “Juice” Berglund (bass, fiddle), Tommy Drinkard (banjo), and Jesse Blue Eads (bass, banjo) became the main Water Tower line up with Feinstein in 2020 although Daggatt, Norris, and Selick still occasionally play with the band. In 2021 they released a limited-edition bootleg album of all new songs called For the Owls. A live studio album called Live from Los Angeles is due to come out in 2023.

Water Tower is known for playing modern bluegrass music mixed with traditional, old time, and punk rock influences. They have opened for and played festivals alongside bands as varied as Against Me!, T.S.O.L., Wanda Jackson, Sarah Shook, and John Craigie. The band has a DIY attitude and many of their albums are self-released. They prefer to book their own shows and tours, and a lot of their time is spent playing for passing cars at freeway off-ramps around Los Angeles. Water Tower is very active in the local bluegrass scene and the band hosts a monthly bluegrass jam event called Hillbilly Hype House. The band itself functions as a collective, with members playing in various side projects. Lead singer/guitarist Feinstein's other credits include playing on and co-producing Rosy Nolan's EP Footprints and Broken Branches with Tim Armstrong from Rancid, playing fiddle in Coffey Anderson's band, and appearing in Anderson's Netflix show Country Ever After.

History

Background (2005-2012) 
In 2005 guitarist/vocalist Kenny Feinstein formed the band The Water Tower Bucket Boys in Portland, Oregon with his neighbor, Josh Rabie on fiddle. They named the band after the water tower in the woods behind Feinstein's house that served as a gathering place for the local teenagers to hang out and play music. The second half of the name was inspired by the DIY washtub bass, or gutbucket, played by their first bass player. The Water Tower Bucket Boys recorded and independently released two full-length albums and two EPs, as well as one early album under the name Water Tower String Band. In 2012 the band changed their name to Water Tower.

Against Me! tour and solo work (2012-2013) 
In November 2012 Water Tower was chosen to open for the punk band Against Me! on a tour of the Southeastern US. A year later Rabie left the band and Feinstein decided to take some time off to record a solo album. The album, entitled Loveless: Hurts to Love, was an acoustic cover of My Bloody Valentine's Loveless. Feinstein called Loveless “an obsession of mine”. He was determined to pull apart the original album layer by layer and recreate it in its entirety using mainly traditional bluegrass instruments such as acoustic guitar, mandolin, and fiddle. To do this, he enlisted the help of his friend Jeff Kazor from The Crooked Jades and engineer Bruce Kaphan, and together they created an “acoustic wall of sound” effect to emulate the distorted, dreamlike quality of the original album. Loveless: Hurts to Love was released on the label Fluff & Gravy in September 2013 to favorable reviews.

Fly Around (2013-2020) 
Following the release of his solo album, Feinstein turned his focus back towards Water Tower. He called up some old musician friends and recruited them to join the band. The new lineup became: Peter Daggatt on guitar, Pat Norris on bass, Harry Selick, the son of director Henry Selick, on drums, and Feinstein on lead vocals, guitar, fiddle, and mandolin. Together they began work on a new album which would eventually become Fly Around. The band reached out to Don Bolles, formerly of punk rock bands the Germs and 45 Grave, and he flew up to Portland to produce the album. They started recording the tracks for Fly Around at Deer Lodge Studios. It was originally meant to be done as a live studio album and only take a few weeks, but it would end up turning into a much bigger project than anyone could have imagined.

In 2014 Feinstein, on the suggestion of Bolles, moved himself and the band to Los Angeles, California. Work on the album was relocated to Nightbird Studios in Hollywood and Ariel Pink was brought on as co-producer. Fly Around would end up taking 7 years to complete with the help of a crowdfunding campaign and the support of a record label, Dutch Records. In addition to co-producing, Bolles and Pink also both play several instruments on the album. Bolles called Fly Around a “concept album” and described it as featuring “traditional bluegrass/old-time…along with some other elements – rock, psychedelia, pop, punk, and even a semi-ambient synth and SFX interlude”. The title track “Fly Around” features guest backing vocals from Willie Watson, formerly of Old Crow Medicine Show, and Gene Louis from Bullets and Octane. The last song on the record is a punk influenced track, aptly titled “Anthem”, which is sung by Feinstein and former Black Flag singer Ron Reyes. The animated music video for “Anthem” was done by Rodd Perry and it depicts black and white cartoon versions of the band floating down the river on a raft from Portland to Los Angeles, where they meet up with Bolles and Reyes. The video was shown at the Portland Film Festival. Fly Around was released on April 24, 2020, in the United States.

During this time, Water Tower would spend 20–40 hours a week busking on the side of various freeways and off-ramps around Los Angeles to support themselves. In 2016 Feinstein was hired to play fiddle in Coffey Anderson's band, and he appeared in Anderson's Netflix reality show Country Ever After. Water Tower also appeared as the wedding band in an episode of another Netflix reality show called Say I Do in 2019. That same year, Feinstein worked as co-producer on Rosy Nolan's EP Footprints and Broken Branches with punk musician Tim Armstrong of the band Rancid. He also played fiddle, mandolin, guitar, bass, and provided backing vocals for the album.

For the Owls (2020-2022) 
In 2017 Feinstein met Joe “Juice” Berglund working in his neighbor's yard and asked him to join the band on fiddle and bass. Berglund is a self-taught musician who had been travelling the country and living out of his car prior to that. A year later the band met Joanne Ledesma who would become their manager. Tommy Drinkard met Feinstein by chance when he was invited to a jam at his house. He stuck around and became the band's banjo player in 2019 after taking lessons from Feinstein. Drinkard's first gig with Water Tower was the 2019 Huck Finn Jubilee, which Feinstein also performed as MC for. By 2020 Berglund and Drinkard would replace Daggatt, Norris, and Selick as the main line up, although the others would continue to play in Water Tower occasionally.

During the COVID-19 pandemic in 2020 the trio continued the practice of busking on the street to practice and make money. They also started streaming online every day to build their fan base. One of their online livestreams was a show hosted by Feinstein and Drinkard called Producing the Internet during which they would invite their fans to participate in the songwriting process with them. They played the virtual Topanga Banjo & Fiddle Contest & Folk Festival that year and Drinkard won first place in the intermediate banjo category.

It was while busking that Water Tower met another new member, Jesse Blue Eads, a young banjo player and electric bassist who had dropped out of college to pursue music. One day he got a call from a friend, letting him know that someone was in his usual busking spot in Hermosa Beach. It turned out to be the band and the four of them became fast friends. They asked Eads to join them on their next tour of the West Coast in summer 2021. One of the shows on this tour was presented by Thompson Guitars near their workshop in Sisters, Oregon. Feinstein, who plays a custom Thompson dreadnought with an extra-large sound hole inspired by bluegrass legends Clarence White and Tony Rice, is a featured musician on the Preston Thompson Guitars website. They also played at Summer's End – The Draper Rendezvous festival in Hailey, Idaho with Sarah Shook & the Disarmers and John Craigie. When they returned from touring, Feinstein and Drinkard started hosting a monthly bluegrass open mic event at Silverlake Lounge in Silver Lake called “Hillbilly Hype House”.

The following year, Water Tower released another album, a limited-edition bootleg called For the Owls. It is dedicated to their fans, whom they call “the owls”. The album consists of live studio recordings of new songs and was available for purchase during their tour that summer. The band played the main stage at the 2022 Topanga Banjo & Fiddle Contest & Folk Festival in May alongside AJ Lee & Blue Summit as part of the tour. They also did a session at Paste Studio Tahoe for Paste Magazine with Matt Axton, Hoyt Axton's son. In October the band played at the Huck Finn Jubilee and taught workshops. In December, Feinstein hosted a house show in Echo Park featuring flat-pick guitarist Jake Eddy and Jordan Tice. The show served as Eddy's California premier.

Live from Los Angeles (2023-present) 
At the start of January 2023, Water Tower played pop star Katy Perry's New Year's Eve party at the Carriage & Western Arts Museum in Santa Barbara, California. The party was a western themed costume party featuring music and line dancing. Katy Perry shared images from the party and a video of Water Tower's performance on her Instagram page. Later that month, the band played the CBA Great 48 jam.

On February 3, Water Tower released the first single from their upcoming album Live from Los Angeles called “Take Me Back”. Ahead of the song's release, celebrity friends and fans of the band including rapper Riff Raff, singer Mark McGrath from the band Sugar Ray, the bassist Bootsy Collins from Parliament-Funkadelic, and Nick Hexum from 311 recorded shout-out videos urging others to listen to the single. Live from Los Angeles was recorded all in one day at Palomino Studios in Los Angeles after the band returned from their tour last summer.

Water Tower is slated to play the main stage at the upcoming CBA Father's Day Festival in Grass Valley, California along with Molly Tuttle & The Golden Highway later this year.

Musical style and legacy 
Water Tower's music is often described as a combination of modern bluegrass with punk influences. This is apparent in their first album Fly Around which features traditional bluegrass and old-time melodies and instruments as well as modern, punk, and psychedelic elements. Feinstein also invited punk legend Don Bolles to co-produce the album with garage rock artist Ariel Pink, to give it more of a punk rock edge. The last track on the album, “Anthem” is sung by both Feinstein and Ron Reyes, the former lead singer of punk rock band Black Flag. Feinstein counts punk bands like Black Flag and Rancid as among his earliest musical inspirations. Water Tower was asked to open for the punk band Against Me! in 2012 and to play the Punk Rock Bowling Festival along with bands like T.S.O.L., Steve Soto, and Wanda Jackson in 2013. The band's live performances feature fast playing and at times, moshing.

At the same time, Water Tower remains loyal to their bluegrass and old-time roots. Feinstein recalls how the band started out just trying to “recreate” the traditional music “as faithfully as possible” as a Foghorn Stringband cover band before delving into modern bluegrass and eventually evolving to have their own unique, punk edged take on it. Their main bluegrass influences besides Foghorn Stringband are Clarence White and Tony Rice.

Some themes that appear in Water Tower's songs include hope of recovery, the good and bad times in life, love, acceptance, and death. Feinstein says their inspiration for songwriting comes from the things they have seen and experienced either while playing music on tour or out on the streets while busking at home.

Water Tower also has a punk rock, DIY attitude off-stage, preferring to independently record and release albums and schedule their own house shows, events, and tours with friends in the scene. When they aren't working in the studio or touring, the band can be found busking by the sides of streets or at freeway exits around Los Angeles. During the COVID-19 pandemic they also turned to livestreaming their music online for fans as another way to support themselves. Every member of the band plays multiple different instruments and participates in different side projects in addition to Water Tower. Drinkard describes the band as “a kind of music collective” that shares a “mutual fan base".

Band members

Current members 

 Kenny Feinstein – lead vocals, guitar, fiddle, mandolin (2005–present)
 Tommy Drinkard – banjo, vocals (2019–present)
 Joe “Juice” Berglund – standup bass, fiddle, backing vocals (2017–present)
 Jesse Blue Eads – electric bass, banjo, vocals (2020–present)

Auxiliary members 

 Taylor Estes – electric bass (2020–present)
 Walter Spencer – stand up bass (2012–present)
 Peter Daggatt – guitar, backing vocals (2013-2020 as main member, 2020-present as auxiliary)
 Pat Norris – bass (2013-2020 as main member, 2020-present as auxiliary)
 Harry Selick – drums (2013-2020 as main member, 2020-present as auxiliary)

Former members 

 Josh Rabie – fiddle, backing vocals (2005-2013)

Discography

Studio albums 
The Squid and the Fiddle (as Water Tower String Band) (self-released, 2008)

Catfish on the Line (as The Water Tower Bucket Boys) (self-released, 2009)

Sole Kitchen (as The Water Tower Bucket Boys) (self-released, 2010)

Fly Around (Dutch Records, 2020)

Live from Los Angeles (upcoming self-released, 2023)

Bootlegs 
For the Owls (self-released, 2022)

EPs 
EEL-P (as The Water Tower Bucket Boys) (self-released, 2009)

Where the Crow Don't Fly (as The Water Tower Bucket Boys) (Type Foundry, 2011)

References

External links 
 Band website
 Water Tower discography at Discogs

Old-time bands
Musical groups from California
Musical groups from Los Angeles
Musical groups from Portland, Oregon
Musical groups established in 2005
Bluegrass music groups